Elak Dase 192A is an Indian reserve of the English River First Nation in Saskatchewan. It is 27 miles southeast of Pine River.

References

Indian reserves in Saskatchewan
Division No. 18, Saskatchewan